Hailey Dean Mysteries is an American/Canadian mystery film series that stars Kellie Martin as the titular character, Hailey Dean, a prosecutor working with the District Attorney's office who later quits her job to become a marriage counselor and therapist and is based on characters from Nancy Grace’s best-selling series of “Hailey Dean Mystery” novels. The series is set in Atlanta and airs on the Hallmark Movies & Mysteries channel in the US. Kellie Martin is not the first actress to portray Hailey Dean. Jennie Garth took on the role in a 2012 Lifetime (TV Network) movie based on Nancy Grace's first book in the series, "The 11th Victim". This movie was also produced by Nancy Grace.

Main cast
Kellie Martin as Hailey Dean, a marriage counselor and therapist who used to work as a prosecutor working with the District Attorney's office
Viv Leacock as Fincher Garland, an investigator and a close friend of Hailey's who helps her in various ways during all her investigations
Giacomo Baessato as Detective Danny Morgan, a homicide detective and the younger brother of Will, Hailey's deceased fiance, who often lets her join in on his investigations.
Lucia Walters as Detective Charlene Montgomery (Monty), a homicide detective who replaces Detective Morgan and also becomes friendly with Hailey
Matthew MacCaull as Dr. Jonas McClellan, a newly appointed Medical Examiner who begins a relationship with Hailey
Emily Holmes as Sabrina Butler, Hailey's friend and fellow therapist who runs the practice alongside Hailey

Characters

 A dark grey cell indicates the character was not in the film.

Films

Production and filming
The films were shot in British Columbia, Canada.

References

External links
Official Website
Hailey Dean Mystery on Goodreads
Hailey Dean Mysteries on IMDb

Film series introduced in 2016
American film series
American mystery films
American television films
Canadian mystery films
Canadian television films
Hallmark Channel original programming
Hallmark Channel original films